Puritan Sabbatarianism or Reformed Sabbatarianism, often just Sabbatarianism, is observance of Sabbath in Christianity that is typically characterised by devotion of the entire day to worship, and consequently the avoidance of recreational activities.

Unlike seventh-day Sabbatarians, Puritan Sabbatarians practice first-day Sabbatarianism (Sunday Sabbatarianism), keeping Sunday as Sabbath and referring to it as the Lord's Day. Puritan Sabbath, expressed in the Westminster Confession of Faith, is often contrasted with Continental Sabbath: the latter follows the Continental Reformed confessions such as the Heidelberg Catechism, which emphasise rest and worship on the Lord's Day, but do not forbid recreational activities. However, John Calvin believed Christians were commanded to avoid recreation as well as work on Sunday to devote the day to worship, and during the seventeenth century there was consensus among continental as well as British Reformed theologians that the entire Sabbath was to be set aside for worship.

Origins

While John Calvin's theology of the fourth commandment differed from that of the Puritans, he believed that Christians were commanded to cease from labor and recreation to devote the entire day to worship. The Genevan Consistory during the time of Calvin regularly interviewed people for working or engaging in recreation considered inappropriate for spiritual refreshment such as hunting, dancing, banqueting, playing tennis or billiards, or bowling skittles on Sundays.

During the Vestiarian controversy, Reformers were spurred to develop the regulative principle of worship, a fundamental article that no corporate worship is permissible that does not have the sanction of Scripture, whether stated explicitly, or derived by a necessary deduction from Scripture. By the 17th century, Puritans had applied the regulative principle to devote first-day Sabbath entirely to God, indulging in neither the labors nor the recreations common to the other six days.

History

Sunday Sabbatarianism as jure divino or divinely ordained command, in contrast to non-Sabbatarian and antinomian reliance on Christian liberty, thus was a closely linked development to the regulative principle amongst English Protestants over the 17th century. Stricter observance of Lord's Day arose in England and Scotland, in reaction to the Prelatic laxity with which Sunday observance was customarily kept, which included recreations classified as lawful. Opposed also by seventh-day Sabbatarians John Traske, Theophilus Brabourne, and the Seventh Day Baptists, some Puritans stated that Sabbath was a proportion (one-seventh) rather than a particular day (either Saturday or Sunday), while others further specifically identified the first day as Christian Sabbath.

Though there are slight differences between confessional formulations of British and continental European Reformed churches, in the seventeenth century there came to be a consensus among the Reformed that the Sabbath should be devoted primarily to the worship of God.

Puritan Sabbatarianism is enshrined in its most mature expression, the Westminster Confession of Faith (1646), in the Calvinist theological tradition (Chapter 21, Of Religious Worship, and the Sabbath Day, sections 7–8):

Jonathan Edwards delivered three sermons on The Perpetuity and Change of the Sabbath that are central to Puritan tradition. The first sermon emphasises Sabbath as an immutable, divine natural and positive law (as to proportion), while the second emphasises an alteration of "another law, which determined the beginning and ending of their working days" (as to order); the first day of creation is regarded as unknowable, and the weekday assigned to Sabbath regarded as not revealed until the Exodus. The third sermon regards the proper keeping of Sabbath: "We are strictly to abstain from being outwardly engaged in any worldly thing, either worldly business or recreations," because "the sabbath-day is an accepted time, a day of salvation, a time wherein God especially loves to be sought, and loves to be found."

Reformed Sabbatarian theologian G. I. Williamson accordingly suggests that "television, reading of newspapers and magazines, and engaging in sports and excursions ... are not proper to the Sabbath because 'Sabbath' means to cease from these things in order to give one day exclusively to worship and the reading of God's Word, etc." The cessation described entails all engrossing activities of the six days of the week, whether employment or recreations, and thus specifically excludes ceasing only from work while continuing favorite recreations. Williamson affirms striving toward holiness, calling it a lofty goal to avoid "even thoughts and words about our worldly employments or recreations."

Though modern expression of Puritan Sabbath has been caricatured as being boring, organisations that promote Sabbaths as joyous, delightful appointments include Day One Christian Ministries.

Historical theologian R. Scott Clark has criticized the idea that distinct "Puritan" and "Continental" views on the Sabbath exist, instead arguing that the Reformed have historically agreed that recreation is prohibited on Sunday.

In the United States throughout the nineteenth century, Protestant moralists organized the "Sabbath reform" that pushed for stricter Sunday keeping. Their efforts prompted the enforcement of Sunday laws (often called blue laws) that legally barred a variety of activities on Sundays. The enforcement of Sunday laws gave rise to substantial church-state debates as well as minority-rights movements fueled by the resistance of Jews, Seventh Day Baptists, Catholics, and other religious minorities.

Civil Law 
In 1671, the Province of Massachusetts Bay, codified the following law with respect to the Sunday Sabbath in its charter:

See also

Lord's Day
Sabbath desecration
Sabbath in Christianity
Seventh Day Baptists

References

Westminster Assembly
Sabbath in Christianity
Christian ethics
Mosaic law in Christian theology